Scottsboro (also Scottsborough) is an unincorporated community in Baldwin County, Georgia, United States.

History
A post office called Scottsboro was established in 1896, and remained in operation until 1902. The community was named after General John Scott, an early settler.

References

Unincorporated communities in Baldwin County, Georgia
Unincorporated communities in Georgia (U.S. state)